Grameenphone, widely abbreviated as (d/b/a) GP, is the leading telecommunications service provider in Bangladesh, with 83.02 million subscribers (as of January 2022). It is a joint venture between Telenor and Grameen Telecom Corporation. Telenor, a telecommunication company from Norway, owns a 55.8% share of Grameenphone, Grameen Telecom owns 34.2% and the remaining 10% is publicly held.

Grameenphone was the first company to introduce GSM technology in Bangladesh. Grammenphone was the first private company to introduce 5G network in Bangladesh, which was first tested in Dhaka and Chittagong metro area in mid-2022. In September 2022, Grameenphone successfully conducted trials for the second time in Dhaka, Chittagong, Sylhet, Khulna, Rajshahi, Barisal, Mymensingh and Rangpur cities.

History
Founder Iqbal Quadir founded Grameenphone to provide universal mobile phone access throughout Bangladesh, including its rural areas. He was inspired by the Grameen Bank micro-credit model and envisioned a business model where a cell phone can serve as a source of income. After leaving his job as an investment banker in the United States, Quadir met and successfully raised money from New York-based investor and philanthropist Joshua Mailman. He then returned to Bangladesh and worked for three years to gain support from organisations such as Grameen Bank and the Norwegian telecom company, Telenor.

Grameenphone received a license for cellular phone operation in Bangladesh from the Ministry of Posts and Telecommunications on 28 November 1996. The company started operations on 26 March 1997, Independence Day in Bangladesh.

Changing logo
On 16 November 2006, Grameenphone officially changed its logo to match its parent company Telenor's logo.

Numbering scheme

Grameenphone uses the following numbering scheme for its subscribers:

 +880 13 XXXXXXXX
 +880 17 XXXXXXXX

880 is the ISD code for Bangladesh and is needed only in case of dialing from outside Bangladesh (otherwise, it may be substituted by a 0, making the prefix 013 & 017).

13 & 17 is the prefix for Grameenphone as allocated by the government of Bangladesh. The following eight-digit number XXXXXXXX is the subscriber number. After exhausting the 017 series, Grameenphone became the first operator to launch a second series, the 013.

Network
According to Grameenphone, it has invested more than BDT 347.4 billion (US$4.12 billion) to build the network infrastructure since 2018. Grameenphone has built the largest cellular network in the country. Until 2021, (as of October 2021) Grameenphone has 18,023 base transceiver station (BTS), which geographically covers the largest population of Bangladesh with mobile network services.

The Grameenphone network is also GPRS/EDGE/3G-enabled, with a growing 4G network, allowing internet access within its coverage area.

Products

Grameenphone introduced pre-paid mobile phone service in Bangladesh in September 1999 via an EDGE/GPRS/3G/4G enabled network. Grameenphone was the first mobile operator in Bangladesh to offer internet via EDGE and 3G 4G services to its subscribers.

Grameenphone has developed several services, such as GP Music, a music streaming service launched in 2015, and Bioscope, a video streaming service launched in 2016 to stream movies, dramas and live TV. The company also owns an e-commerce app, Shoparu, offering door-to-door delivery service to all areas of Bangladesh, including rural areas. Feature phone users may visit any one of the host of Grameenphone Express Centers to order their goods online and receive home delivery.

In 2017, Grameenphone introduced its MyGP app that allowed subscribers, through an embedded platform called Flexiload, to personalize their own cell phone packages and discounts based on their personal need for voice minutes, data volumes, text messaging. The MyGP app allowed customers to monitor their usage in real time. MyGP now encompasses GP apps such as Bioscope and Shoparu, as well as third party ride sharing apps like Uber and Shohoz.

In March 2022, Grameenphone released embedded-SIM (eSIM), for the foremost time in Bangladesh.

All services 
 Bioscope (Live TV) is a video streaming platform for original show, drama, movie and live tv launched in 2016.
 Ekhanei.com was e-commerce service (also known as CellBaazar) to enable users sell or buy products through mobile or internet. It was free to use for all Grameenphone customers, but was closed in 2017.
 GP BoiGhor is an online eBook service
 GP Gamebox is a subscription-based app store launched in 2014, which is powered by Bemobi
 GP Music is a music streaming launched in 2015.
 GPAY is a service to enable users to pay their utility bills through mobile launched in 2016.
 Mobileplay is an online gaming service.
Grameenphone also owns startup accelerator GP Accelerator and startup mentorship platform White-Board. The accelerator program launched its 6th batch of startups for a 4.5-month-long program on 6 November 2019, at GP House.
 Various other services like stock information, Instant Messaging, SMS Based Alerts/Services, Voice-based Services, Downloads, music, Cricket Updates, Web SMS, Mobile Backup etc.

Skitto 

In 2017, Grameenphone launched a specialized SIM for the data hungry, digitally savvy generation. Skitto is an end to end digital product of Grameenphone that completely runs on an app. Although Skitto SIM is a separate product, it uses Grameenphone's core numbering scheme and its core network. As it is a digital product, mobile number portability is not supported from any other mobile operator and also from Grameenphone number itself. Skitto users can control their various packages using its own Skitto app, instead of the USSD codes and the MyGP app. The difference between the Skitto app and MyGP app is that it has a forum based system where users can solve their own problems.

Skitto's mobile app guarantees a continuous digital customer journey with all types of offers. In addition to Grameenphone's customer care centers and street Skitto points, it has online SIM sales management process. All advertising activity is controlled by the mobile app. Different types of advertising campaigns with loyalty and referral capabilities are given through the app. Dynamic customer segmentation and digitized customer notification process. It provides individual features such as creating own packages, recommendations, rewards, in-app chat for customer service, emergency credits, credit sharing, self-care and more.

Other activities
GrameenPhone has E-SIM

Village phone

With the help of Grameenphone, Grameen Telecom operates the national Village Phone programme, alongside its own parent Grameen Bank and the International Finance Corporation (IFC), acting as the sole provider of telecommunications services to a number of rural areas. Most Village Phone participants are women living in remote areas. Village Phone works as an owner-operated GSM payphone whereby a borrower takes a BDT 12,000 (US$200) loan from Grameen Bank to subscribe to Grameenphone and is then trained on how to operate it and how to charge others to use it at a profit. As of September 2006, there are more than 255,000 Village Phones in operation in 55,000 villages around Bangladesh. This program has been replicated also in some other countries including in Uganda and Rwanda in Africa.

Grameenphone Corporate Headquarter (GP House)

Grameenphone Corporate Headquarter (popularly known as "GP House"). Located at Bashundhara R/A, Dhaka, was formally inaugurated on 23 November 2010. GP House considered one of the successful office buildings in Bangladesh. It has been designed by Architect Mohammad Foyez Ullah, Mustapha Khalid Palash and their team.

Community Information Centers

Community Information Center (CIC) or GPCIC was an initiative aimed at providing internet access and other communications services to rural areas. In February 2006, 26 CICs were established across the country as a pilot project. In this project, Grameenphone provided GSM/EDGE/GPRS infrastructure and technical support and other partners Grameen Telecom Corporation and Society for Economic and Basic Advancement (SEBA), were involved in selecting and training entrepreneurs to run the village centres. These CICs were used for a wide variety of business and personal purposes, from accessing health and agricultural information to using government services to video conferencing with relatives overseas. Grameenphone also trained entrepreneurs so that they could demonstrate to people how to set up an e-mail account and best make use of the Internet. Currently, none of the CICs are being operated by GP.

Grameenphone Centres

A Grameenphone Centre (GPC) serves as a "one stop solution" for customers, with all telecommunications products and services, under a single roof. A Grameenphone Centre also sells phones from vendors like Samsung, Apple, Xiaomi and more. EDGE/GPRS modems and accessories such chargers and headphones are also sold at GPCs.

As of February 2013, there are 85 GPCs and they are strategically located at all major locations of the country is operated by Grameenphone. There are two GP Lounges for customer experience of GP Digital Services. There are also 376,285 unique recharge outlets and 6,836 GP Express Stores all across Bangladesh.

Awards

 In 2002, Grameenphone was adjudged the Joint Venture Enterprise of the Year at the Bangladesh Business Awards.
 In February 2007, Grameenphone was again presented an award for its 'HealthLine Service' at the 3GSM World Congress held in Barcelona, Spain.
In 2007, and consecutively in 2015 and 2016, Grameenphone received the "Best Brand Award" by the Brand Forum. 
In 2010, 2011 and 2013, Grameenphone received the "Best Employer" award by BDJOBs. 
Grameenphone received "Green Mobile Award" by GSMA for extensive Climate Change Program at Mobile World Congress 2014.
Grameenphone received the "Innovation in Corporate Social Responsibility Practices" award at the Bangladesh CSR Leadership Award 2018.

Criticism

Current issues and challenges 
Significant market player: In November 2018, Bangladesh Telecommunication Regulatory Commission (BTRC) identified SMP as institutions with at least the following a) more than 40% market revenue share, b) more than 40% of market share, or c) holding more than 40% of spectrum. Grameenphone was declared a Significant Market Player by BTRC as having over 40% market and revenue share. Disagreements between the operator and the regulator have since ensued regarding the penalties for being a SMP. Grameenphone has maintained that it supports a competition framework consistent with the applicable laws and international best practices; and that directives should not restrict an entities' ability to grow, innovate or invest. The company has earned market share through fair practices and within the stipulated market regulation overseeing the industry. BTRC on the other hand has been trying to impose various rules on the operator in order to restrict the operator's growth and maintain healthy competition in the market. Despite various regulatory issues, Grameenphone continues to maintain a healthy growth in the market.

BTRC Audit claims: In April 2019, BTRC issued a letter to Grameenphone claiming almost BDT 12,600 cr (US$1.5 billion) in dues. GP was issued a demand letter and given two weeks to pay the dues, according to BTRC Chairman. In response to the move by the government authorities, Grameenphone stated, "Throughout the entire process we have pointed out errors in the methodologies, procedure and substance of this audit exercise; however, our observations have gone unheeded. Grameenphone is a transparent company and adheres to the applicable laws of the land".

References

External links

Telenor
Mobile phone companies of Bangladesh
Telecommunications companies established in 1997
Companies listed on the Chittagong Stock Exchange
Telecommunications companies of Bangladesh
Bangladeshi subsidiaries of foreign companies
Companies listed on the Dhaka Stock Exchange